The Destiny of White Snake (Chinese: 天乩之白蛇传说) is a 2018 Chinese television series loosely based on the Chinese ancient folk legend Legend of the White Snake. It stars Yang Zi, Ren Jialun, Mao Zijun and Li Man. The series airs on iQiyi from July 9, 2018.

Synopsis
Zi Xuan is the disciple of the Green Emperor and he specializes in medicine and is cultivating to become a deity. He meets a young white snake, whom he nicknamed Xiao Bai, and kept as a pet. Over the course of time, Xiao Bai gathered enough cultivation to transform into a teenage human girl, and she eventually grows closer to Zi Xuan and developed a strong romance with him. While trying to find a herb that would save Zi Xuan's life after he is injured, she accidentally breaks a heavenly seal at the elixir chamber of Mount Jiuxi and releases an ancient beast, the black water dragon, from thousand years of imprisonment on the human world. To save the world, Zi Xuan sacrifices himself and disintegrates, but before he fades, he gives Xiao Bai a proper name: Bai Yaoyao.

After Zi Xuan's death, Bai Yaoyao is devastated and decides to retreat from the world. A thousand years pass by and they meet again. Zi Xuan, now reborn as Xu Xian, who is the chief of the Yao Shi Palace (medicine valley), remembers nothing of his and Bai YaoYao's past. However, she remembers everything and she tries to ensure that he lives a peaceful life.

Cast

Main

Supporting

Production
Filming commenced at Hengdian World Studios on January 15, 2017 and wrapped up on June 5, 2017.

Interesting Fact

Angie Chiu, who portrayed  Bai Su Zhen  in the 1992's New Legend of Madame White Snake now portrayed  Bai Yaoyao's teacher, Holy Mother of Mount Li in this drama

Soundtrack

Awards and nominations

International broadcast

References

Chinese romantic fantasy television series
2018 Chinese television series debuts
Works based on the Legend of the White Snake
Television series by H&R Century Pictures
IQIYI original programming
Chinese web series
2018 Chinese television series endings
2018 web series debuts